Sarakki lake is a lake in the southern part of Bangalore, India, in the suburb of the J. P. Nagar. It is one of the largest lakes in Bangalore and located on Puttenahalli main road. Sarakki is a portmanteau of the native Kannada language words, Saavira Hakki, which translates to "a thousand birds".

According to a survey conducted by the tehsildar of Bangalore South, 135 encroachments were made into the lake area, following which the High Court of Karnataka, in the case filed by the People's Campaign for Right to water, ordered for clearing the encroached area in August 2014. A 10-day eviction drive began in April 2015 after having issued notices to encroachers.

In 2012, the Sarakki Lake Improvement Trust (SLAIT) was formed to make efforts towards reviving the lake.

References

See also 
 Lakes in Bangalore

Lakes of Bangalore